The 2022–23 Polish Cup is the 69th season of the annual Polish football knockout tournament. It began on 26 July 2021 with the first matches of the preliminary round and ended with the final on 2 May 2023. The 2022–23 edition of the Polish Cup was sponsored by Fortuna, making the official name Fortuna Puchar Polski. Winners of the competition qualified for the qualifying round of the 2022–23 UEFA Europa Conference League.

The defending champions were Raków Częstochowa.

Preliminary round

! colspan="3" style="background:cornsilk;"|26 July 2022

|-
! colspan="9" style="background:cornsilk;"|27 July 2022

|}

First round

|-
! colspan="12" style="background:cornsilk;"|30 August 2022

|-
! colspan="14" style="background:cornsilk;"|31 August 2022

|-
! colspan="5" style="background:cornsilk;"|1 September 2022

|}

Round of 32

|-
! colspan="3" style="background:cornsilk;"|12 October 2022

|-
! colspan="3" style="background:cornsilk;"|18 October 2022

|-
! colspan="3" style="background:cornsilk;"|19 October 2022

|-
! colspan="3" style="background:cornsilk;"|20 October 2022

|}

Round of 16

|-
! colspan="3" style="background:cornsilk;"|8 November 2022

|-
! colspan="3" style="background:cornsilk;"|9 November 2022

|-
! colspan="3" style="background:cornsilk;"|10 November 2022

|}

Quarter-finals

|-
! colspan="3" style="background:cornsilk;"|28 February 2023

|-
! colspan="3" style="background:cornsilk;"|1 March 2023

|}

Semi-finals

|-
! colspan="3" style="background:cornsilk;"|4 April 2023

|-
! colspan="3" style="background:cornsilk;"|5 April 2023

|}

External links 
 90minut.pl

Polish Cup
Cup
Polish Cup seasons